The 2014–15 season was FK Vardar's 23rd consecutive season in First League. This article shows player statistics and all official matches that the club was played during the 2014–15 season.

Vardar was won their eighth Macedonian championship, after only a one year drought.

Squad
As of 1 February 2015

Competitions

First League

League table

First phase

Second phase

Results summary

Results by round

Matches

First phase

Second phase (Championship group)

Macedonian Cup

First round

Second round

Quarter-finals

Statistics

Top scorers

References

FK Vardar seasons
Vardar